Rides At Adventure Cove is a small amusement park area that is part of and owned by the Columbus Zoo and Aquarium in Powell, Ohio. The park was originally part of Wyandot Lake before the zoo purchased the property in 2006, splitting it into two separate sections after the 2006 season. The water park became known as Zoombezi Bay while the dry ride area became Jungle Jack's Landing. The amusement park was named after zoo director emeritus Jack Hanna and opened on May 26, 2008. It debuted with 14 rides and attractions, several of which were retained from the former Wyandot Lake. In 2020, the Jungle Jack's Landing name was dropped with the amusement park area being renamed to tie into the neighboring Adventure Cove area of the Columbus Zoo and Aquarium which opened for the first time on the same year.

Current rides and attractions
Rides At Adventure Cove currently features a collection of classic flat rides, a vintage wooden roller coaster, and a miniature railroad.

Former rides and attractions 
Some rides have been removed from the park including when the area was called Jungle Jack's Landing. Many other rides that were part of Wyandot Lake closed before Jungle Jack's Landing opened and thus are not included in the following list.

References

External links
Columbus Zoo & Aquarium - Rides & Attractions
Columbus Zoo and Aquarium at the Roller Coaster DataBase

Buildings and structures in Delaware County, Ohio
Economy of Columbus, Ohio
Amusement parks in Ohio
Former Six Flags theme parks
Tourist attractions in Delaware County, Ohio
Tourist attractions in Columbus, Ohio
2020 establishments in Ohio